Indology, also known as South Asian studies, is the academic study of the history and cultures, languages, and literature of the Indian subcontinent, and as such is a subset of Asian studies.

The term Indology (in German, Indologie) is often associated with German scholarship, and is used more commonly in departmental titles in German and continental European universities than in the anglophone academy. In the Netherlands, the term Indologie was used to designate the study of Indian history and culture in preparation for colonial service in the Dutch East Indies.

Classical Indology majorly includes the linguistic studies of Sanskrit literature, Pāli and Tamil literature, as well as study of Dharmic religions (like Hinduism, Buddhism, Jainism, etc.). Some of the regional specializations under South Asian studies include:
 Bengali studies — study of culture and languages of Bengal
 Dravidology — study of Dravidian languages of Southern India
 Tamil studies
 Pakistan studies
 Sindhology — the study of the historical Sindh region

Some scholars distinguish Classical Indology from Modern Indology, the former more focussed on Sanskrit, Tamil and other ancient language sources, the latter on contemporary India, its politics and sociology.

History

Precursors 

The beginnings of the study of India by travellers from outside the subcontinent date back at least to Megasthenes (ca. 350–290 BC), a Greek ambassador of the Seleucids to the court of Chandragupta (ruled 322-298 BC), founder of the Mauryan Empire. Based on his life in India Megasthenes composed a four-volume Indica, fragments of which still exist, and which influenced the classical geographers Arrian, Diodor and Strabo. 

Islamic Golden Age scholar Muḥammad ibn Aḥmad Al-Biruni (973–1048) in Tarikh Al-Hind (Researches on India) recorded the political and military history of India and covered India's cultural, scientific, social and religious history in detail.
He studied the anthropology of India, engaging in extensive participant observation with various Indian groups, learning their languages and studying their primary texts, and presenting his findings with objectivity and neutrality using cross-cultural comparisons.

Academic discipline 

Indology as generally understood by its practitioners began in the later Early Modern period and incorporates essential features of modernity, including critical self-reflexivity, disembedding mechanisms and globalization, and the reflexive appropriation of knowledge.  An important feature of Indology since its beginnings in the late eighteenth century has been the development of networks of academic communication and trust through the creation of learned societies like the Asiatic Society of Bengal, and the creation of learned journals like the Journal of the Royal Asiatic Society and Annals of the Bhandarkar Oriental Research Institute.

One of the defining features of Indology is the application of scholarly methodologies developed in European Classical Studies or "Classics" to the languages, literatures and cultures of South Asia.

In the wake of eighteenth century pioneers like William Jones, Henry Thomas Colebrooke, Gerasim Lebedev or August Wilhelm Schlegel, Indology as an academic subject emerged in the nineteenth century, in the context of British India, together with Asian studies in general affected by the romantic Orientalism of the time. The Asiatic Society was founded in Calcutta in 1784, Société Asiatique founded in 1822, the Royal Asiatic Society in 1824, the American Oriental Society in 1842, and the German Oriental Society (Deutsche Morgenländische Gesellschaft) in 1845, the Japanese Association of Indian and Buddhist Studies in 1949.

Sanskrit literature included many pre-modern dictionaries, especially the Nāmaliṅgānuśāsana of Amarasiṃha, but a milestone in the Indological study of Sanskrit literature was publication of the St. Petersburg Sanskrit-Wörterbuch during the 1850s to 1870s. Translations of major Hindu texts in the Sacred Books of the East began in 1879. Otto von Böhtlingk's edition of Pāṇini's grammar appeared in 1887. Max Müller's edition of the Rigveda appeared in 1849–75. Albrecht Weber commenced publishing his pathbreaking journal Indologische Studien in 1849, and in 1897 Sergey Oldenburg launched a systematic edition of key Sanskrit texts, "Bibliotheca Buddhica".

Professional literature and associations

Indologists typically attend conferences such as the American Association of Asian Studies, the American Oriental Society annual conference, the World Sanskrit Conference, and national-level meetings in the UK, Germany, India, Japan, France and elsewhere.

They may routinely read and write in journals such as Indo-Iranian Journal, Journal of the Royal Asiatic Society, Journal of the American Oriental Society, Journal asiatique, the Journal of the German Oriental Society (ZDMG), Wiener Zeitschrift für die Kunde Südasiens, Journal of Indian Philosophy, Bhandarkar Oriental Research Institute, Journal of Indian and Buddhist Studies (Indogaku Bukkyogaku Kenkyu), Bulletin de l'École française d'Extrême Orient, and others.

They may be members of such professional bodies as the American Oriental Society, the Royal Asiatic Society of Great Britain and Ireland, the Société Asiatique, the Deutsche Morgenlāndische Gesellschaft and others.

List of indologists
The following is a list of prominent academically qualified Indologists.

Historical scholars

 Megasthenes (350-290 BC)
 Al-Biruni (973-1050)
 Gaston-Laurent Cœurdoux (1691–1779)
 Anquetil Duperron (1731–1805)
 William Jones (1746–1794)
 Charles Wilkins (1749–1836)
 Colin Mackenzie (1753–1821)
 Dimitrios Galanos (1760–1833)
 Henry Thomas Colebrooke (1765–1837)
 Jean-Antoine Dubois (1765–1848)
 August Wilhelm Schlegel (1767–1845)
 James Mill (1773–1836).
 Horace Hayman Wilson (1786–1860)
 Franz Bopp (1791–1867)
 Duncan Forbes (linguist) (1798–1868)
 James Prinsep (1799-1840)
 Hermann Grassmann (1809-1877)
 John Muir (indologist) (1810–1882)
 Edward Balfour (1813–1889)
 Robert Caldwell (1814–1891)
 Alexander Cunningham (1814–1893)
 Hermann Gundert (1814–1893)
 Otto von Bohtlingk (1815–1904)
 Monier Monier-Williams (1819–1899)
 Henry Yule (1820-1889)
 Rudolf Roth (1821–1893)
 Theodor Aufrecht (1822–1907)
 Max Müller (1823–1900)
 Albrecht Weber (1825–1901)
 Ralph T. H. Griffith (1826–1906)
 William Dwight Whitney (1827-1894)
 Ferdinand Kittel (1832–1903)
 Edwin Arnold (1832–1904)
 Johan Hendrik Caspar Kern (1833–1917)
 Gustav Solomon Oppert (1836–1908)
 Georg Bühler (1837–1898)
 Chintaman Vinayak Vaidya (1861–1938) 
 Ramakrishna Gopal Bhandarkar (1837–1925)
 Arthur Coke Burnell (1840-1882)
 Julius Eggeling (1842–1918)
 Paul Deussen (1845–1919)
 Vincent Arthur Smith (1848–1920)
 James Darmesteter (1849–1894)
 Hermann Jacobi (1850–1937)
 Kashinath Trimbak Telang (1850–1893)
 Alois Anton Führer (1853–1930)
 Jacob Wackernagel (1853-1938)
 Arthur Anthony Macdonell (1854-1930)
 Hermann Oldenberg (1854–1920)
 Maurice Bloomfield (1855–1928)
 E. Hultzsch (1857-1927)
 Mark Aurel Stein (1862–1943)
 P. T. Srinivasa Iyengar(1863–1931)
 Moriz Winternitz (1863–1937)
 Fyodor Shcherbatskoy (1866–1942)
 F.W. Thomas (1867–1956)
 Jadunath Sarkar (1870-1958)
 S. Krishnaswami Aiyangar (1871–1947)
 Percy Brown (1872–1955)
 John Hubert Marshall (1876–1958)
 Arthur Berriedale Keith (1879–1944)
 Pandurang Vaman Kane (1880–1972)
 Pierre Johanns (1882–1955)
 Andrzej Gawronski (1885–1927)
 Willibald Kirfel (1885–1964)
 Johannes Nobel (1887–1960)
 Betty Heimann (1888-1961)
 Alice Boner (1889–1981)
 Heinrich Zimmer (1890–1943)
 Ervin Baktay (1890–1963)
 Mortimer Wheeler (1890–1976)
 B. R. Ambedkar (1891–1956)
 K. A. Nilakanta Sastri (1892–1975)
 Mahapandit Rahul Sankrityayan (1893–1963)
 Vasudev Vishnu Mirashi (1893–1985)
 V. R. Ramachandra Dikshitar (1896–1953)
 Dasharatha Sharma (1903–1976)
 Shakti M. Gupta (1927-
 S. Srikanta Sastri (1904-1974)
 Joseph Campbell (1904–1987)
 Murray Barnson Emeneau (1904–2005)
 Jan Gonda (1905–1991)
 Paul Thieme (1905–2001)
 Jean Filliozat (1906–1982)
 Alain Danielou (1907–1994)
 F B J Kuiper (1907–2003)
 Thomas Burrow (1909–1986)
 Jagdish Chandra Jain (1909–1993)
 Ramchandra Narayan Dandekar (1909-2001)
 Arthur Llewellyn Basham (1914–1986)
 Richard De Smet (1916–1997)
 P. N. Pushp (1917–1998) 
 Ahmad Hasan Dani (1920–2009)
 Frank-Richard Hamm (1920—1973) 
 Madeleine Biardeau (1922–2010)
 Awadh K. (AK) Narain (1925-2013)
 V. S. Pathak (1926–2003)
 Kamil Zvelebil (1927–2009)
 J. A. B. van Buitenen (1928–1979)
 Tatyana Elizarenkova (1929–2007)
 Bettina Baumer (1940–)
 Anncharlott Eschmann (1941–1977)
 William Dalrymple (1965–present)
 Arvind Sharma (1940–present)
 Harilal Dhruv (1856—1896)
 Ram Swarup (1920–1998)
 Mikhail Konstantinovich Kudryavtsev (1911–1992)
 Daniel H. H. Ingalls, Sr. (1916-1999), Wales Professor of Sanskrit, Harvard University
 Sita Ram Goel (1921–2003)
 Natalya Romanovna Guseva (1914–2010)
 Ram Sharan Sharma (1919–2011), Founding Chairperson of Indian Council of Historical Research; Professor Emeritus, Patna University
 Bhadriraju Krishnamurti (1928–2012), Osmania University
 Fida Hassnain (1924-2016) Sri Pratap College, Srinagar
 Heinrich von Stietencron (1933–2018), University of Tübingen, Germany
 Iravatham Mahadevan (1930–2018)- Indian Council of Historical Research
 Stanley Wolpert (1927–2019)- University of California, Los Angeles (emeritus)
 Karel Werner  (1925–2019)
 Stanley Insler (1937–2019), Edward E. Salisbury Professor of Sanskrit and Comparative Philology, Yale University
 Bannanje Govindacharya (1936–2020), scholar in Tatva-vada school of philosophy and Vedic tradition

Contemporary scholars with university posts

 Romila Thapar (1931–present), Professor of Ancient History, Emerita, at the Jawaharlal Nehru University
 Dietmar Rothermund (1933 - 2020), Professor  of the history of South Asia at the Ruprecht-Karls University in Heidelberg
 Hermann Kulke (1938–present), Professor  of South and Southeast Asian history at the Department of History, Kiel University
 Asko Parpola (1941–present)- Professor Emeritus of Indology and South Asian Studies at the University of Helsinki
 Patrick Olivelle (1942–present) Professor Emeritus of Asian Studies at the University of Texas at Austin
 Michael Witzel (1943–present)- Wales Professor of Sanskrit at Harvard University
 Ronald Inden- Professor Emeritus of History, South Asian Languages and Civilizations at the University of Chicago
 George L. Hart (1945–present)- Professor Emeritus of Tamil at the University of California, Berkeley
 Stephanie Jamison (1948–present), Distinguished Professor of Asian Languages and Cultures and of Indo-European Studies at the University of California, Los Angeles 
 Alexis Sanderson  (1948–present) Emeritus Fellow and former Spalding Professor of Eastern Religion and Ethics at All Souls College, Oxford
 Michael D. Willis (The British Museum)
 Gérard Fussman (1940–present) Collège de France
 Wendy Doniger (1940–present) University of Chicago Divinity School, as Mircea Eliade Distinguished Service Professor of the History of Religions
 Thomas Trautmann (1940–present), former Head of the Center for South Asian Studies, University of Michigan
 Kapil Kapoor (1940–present), well known scholar of English Literature, Linguistics, Paninan Grammar, Sanskrit Arts and Aesthetics, Director of Indian Institute of Advanced Studies, Shimla
 Shrivatsa Goswami (1950–present), Indian scholar of Hindu philosophy and art at (Banaras Hindu University), as well as Gaudiya Vaishnava religious leader.
 Edwin Bryant (1957–present) Rutgers University, New Jersey

Other indologists
 Michel Danino, French-Indian author and historical negationist
 Koenraad Elst (1959–present), Hindutva author and, supporter of the Out of India theory
 Georg Feuerstein
 David Frawley, American Hindutva author, astrologer, and historical revisionist
 Rajiv Malhotra, Indian-American Hindutva author and activist 
 Shrikant Talageri, Out of India proponent and Hindu nationalist
 Hans T. Bakker
 Steven J. Rosen, American ISKCON author, founding editor of The Journal of Vaishnava Studies

Indology organisations

 Faculty of Sanskrit Vidya Dharma Vigyan, Banaras Hindu University
 Adyar Library and Research Centre, Chennai
 Bhandarkar Oriental Research Institute, Pune
 Oriental Research Institute Mysore
 Oriental Research Institute & Manuscripts Library, Thiruvananthapuram
 Lalbhai Dalpatbhai Institute of Indology along with Lalbhai Dalpatbhai Museum which is adjacent to the Institute, Ahmedabad, Gujarat, India
 American Institute of Indian Studies
 French Institute of Pondicherry
 The Oxford Centre For Hindu Studies

See also

 Buddhism in the West
 History of India
 Greater India
 Bibliography of India
 Sanskrit
 Sanskrit studies
 Roja Muthiah Research Library
 Area studies
 Dreaming of Words

References

Further reading

Balagangadhara, S. N. (1994). "The Heathen in his Blindness..." Asia, the West, and the Dynamic of Religion. Leiden, New York: E. J. Brill.
 Balagangadhara, S. N. (2012). Reconceptualizing India studies. New Delhi: Oxford University Press.
 Vishwa Adluri, Joydeep Bagchee: The Nay Science: A History of German Indology. Oxford University Press, New York 2014,  (Introduction, p. 1–29).
 Joydeep Bagchee, Vishwa Adluri: "The passion of Paul Hacker: Indology, orientalism, and evangelism." In: Joanne Miyang Cho, Eric Kurlander, Douglas T McGetchin (Eds.), Transcultural Encounters Between Germany and India: Kindred Spirits in the Nineteenth Century. Routledge, New York 2013, p. 215–229.
 Joydeep Bagchee: "German Indology." In: Alf Hiltebeitel (Ed.), Oxford Bibliographies Online: Hinduism. Oxford University Press, New York 2014.
Chakrabarti, Dilip K.: Colonial Indology, 1997, Munshiram Manoharlal: New Delhi.
 Jean Filliozat and Louis Renou – L'inde classique – ISBN B0000DLB66.
 Halbfass, W. India and Europe: An Essay in Understanding. SUNY Press, Albany: 1988
 Inden, R. B. (2010). Imagining India. Bloomington, Ind: Indiana University Press.
 Vishwa Adluri, Joydeep Bagchee: The Nay Science: A History of German Indology. Oxford University Press, New York 2014,  
 Gauri Viswanathan, 1989, Masks of Conquest
 Rajiv Malhotra (2016), Battle for Sanskrit: Dead or Alive, Oppressive or Liberating, Political or Sacred? (Publisher: Harper Collins India)
 Rajiv Malhotra (2016), Academic Hinduphobia: A Critique of Wendy Doniger's Erotic School of Indology (Publisher: Voice of India)
 Antonio de Nicolas, Krishnan Ramaswamy, and Aditi Banerjee (eds.) (2007), Invading the Sacred: An Analysis Of Hinduism Studies In America (Publisher:  Rupa & Co.)
 Shourie, Arun. 2014. Eminent historians: their technology, their line, their fraud. HarperCollins. 
 Trautmann, Thomas. 1997. Aryans and British India, University of California Press, Berkeley.
 Windisch, Ernst. Geschichte der Sanskrit-Philologie und Indischen Altertumskunde. 2 vols. Strasbourg. Trübner, K.J., 1917–1920
 Zachariae, Theodor. Opera minora zur indischen Wortforschung, zur Geschichte der indischen Literatur und Kultur, zur Geschichte der Sanskritphilologie. Ed. Claus Vogel. Wiesbaden 1977, .

External links

 Omilos Meleton
 www.indology.info – since 1995, with associated discussion forum since 1990
 Italian blog with many links to indological websites
 Books related to Indology (commercial publisher's website)
 The Veda as Studied by European Scholars (Gifford Lectures Online)

Institutes

 Vienna
 Heidelberg 
 Halle
 Mainz
 French Institute of Pondicherry
 Tübingen
 Zürich
 Oxford

Library guides
 
 
 
 
 
 
 

 
Asian studies